Mount Nenggao is a mountain in Taiwan.

References

Landforms of Nantou County 
Nenggao